A list of films produced in Argentina in 1980:

External links and references
 Argentine films of 1980 at the Internet Movie Database

1980
Argentine
Films